Valerie Jody Harwood is an American Environmental Microbiologist. She is chair of Department of Integrative Biology, at University of South Florida. She was named a 2021 Fellow of the American Association for the Advancement of Science.

She graduated from Iowa State University, State University of New York at Plattsburgh, and  Old Dominion University.  She was principal investigator for an EPA study. Her group found  drug-resistant bacteria in a sewer line break.

References 

American microbiologists
University of South Florida faculty
Iowa State University alumni
State University of New York at Plattsburgh alumni
Old Dominion University alumni
Living people

Year of birth missing (living people)